The following is a list of ecoregions in Kenya, as identified by the Worldwide Fund for Nature (WWF).

Terrestrial ecoregions
by major habitat type

Tropical and subtropical moist broadleaf forests

 East African montane forests
 Eastern Arc forests
 Northern Zanzibar–Inhambane coastal forest mosaic

Tropical and subtropical grasslands, savannas, and shrublands

 East Sudanian savanna
 Northern Acacia–Commiphora bushlands and thickets
 Somali Acacia–Commiphora bushlands and thickets
 Southern Acacia–Commiphora bushlands and thickets
 Victoria Basin forest–savanna mosaic

Flooded grasslands and savannas

 East African halophytics

Montane grasslands and shrublands

 East African montane moorlands

Deserts and xeric shrublands

 Masai xeric grasslands and shrublands

Mangroves

 East African mangroves

Freshwater ecoregions
by bioregion

Nilo-Sudan

 Shebele-Juba Catchments
 Lake Turkana

Great Lakes

 Lakes Kivu, Edward, George, and Victoria

Eastern and Coastal

 Kenyan Coastal Rivers
 Pangani
 Southern Eastern Rift

Marine ecoregions
 East African Coral Coast

See also 
 Environment of Kenya

References
 Burgess, Neil, Jennifer D’Amico Hales, Emma Underwood (2004). Terrestrial Ecoregions of Africa and Madagascar: A Conservation Assessment. Island Press, Washington DC.
 
 Thieme, Michelle L. (2005). Freshwater Ecoregions of Africa and Madagascar: A Conservation Assessment. Island Press, Washington DC.

 
Kenya
Ecoregions